() is a village in the county borough of Wrexham, North East Wales, in the community of Cefn. It was formerly part of the ancient parish of Ruabon, and is located between Wrexham and Llangollen. It is close to the villages of Trevor, Cefn Mawr, Ruabon and Plas Madoc.

Parts of  have views across the River Dee and the Dee Valley.   has a chemist, kebab shop and two Chinese take-aways and once had a petrol station and newsagents / post office. It boasts many buildings built from "Ruabon Red brick", including several chapels which are now closed and converted.

Edward Lloyd Rowland established an ironworks in Acrefair in 1817. Following his bankruptcy in 1825, the works were bought by the British Iron Company. The company was re-formed in 1843 as the New British Iron Company and they continued to operate the works until its closure in 1887. The site was subsequently occupied by a succession of businesses, latterly Air Products, which produced air separation and cryogenic storage equipment. The site ceased commercial operations in late 2009.

The site was the American company's first venture in Europe. Monsanto later operated the site as FlexSys, one of their subsidiaries, but production on this site ceased in 2010.

Coal, clay and iron were also worked in the area during its industrial period.

Acrefair railway station was formerly a station on the Ruabon–Barmouth line, it closed to passengers on 18 January 1965 as part of the Beeching Axe. The Ruabon Brook Tramway passed through the village at street level, serving the Monsanto works and other local
industry.

References

Villages in Wrexham County Borough